Shah Taqi (also romanized as Shāh Taqī; also known as Shāh Ţaqā and Emām Taqī) is a village in Darzab Rural District, located in the Central District of Mashhad County, Razavi Khorasan Province, Iran. At the 2006 census, its population was 241, and had 60 families.

References 

Populated places in Mashhad County